"Bustin' Out" is a 1981 EP by the New York based No Wave music group Material. The vocals here are by Nona Hendryx. This single sees the band move further away from their experimental beginnings and in a funkier, more club-friendly direction.

Track listing
"Bustin' Out" (Bill Laswell, Michael Beinhorn, Fred Maher, Nona Hendryx, Ronny Drayton, T. Scott) – 3:40
"Over and Over" [Long Version] (Laswell, Beinhorn, Maher, Scott) – 5:36
"Bustin' Out" [Long Version] (Laswell, Beinhorn, Maher, Hendryx, Drayton, Scott) – 8:06

Promo 12"
"Bustin' out" – 8:27
"Bustin' out" [Heavy Metal Mix] – 8:06

2004 Release
"Bustin' out" [Remix] – 7:50
"It's a holiday" [Remix] – 6:50
"Over and over" – 5:35

Personnel
Bill Laswell – basses
Michael Beinhorn – synthesizers
Fred Maher – drums

Additional personnel
Nona Hendryx – vocals
Ronny Drayton – guitar

Production
Recorded at OAO Studio, Brooklyn, New York and RPM Sound Studio, New York City. Produced by Material with Martin Bisi.

Release history
1981 – Ze Records / Celluloid, CEL 6592 (12")
1981 – Ze Records / Island, IS 49741 (7", only tracks 1 + 2)
1981 – Ze Records / Island, 12WIP 6713 (12", only Tracks 2 + 3)
1981 – Promo 12" – Island (USA), PRO A 958
2004 Release – Ze Records (USA), ZEREC 1207 (12")

References

Material (band) albums
1981 EPs
Celluloid Records albums
ZE Records EPs